Ben D'Aguilar (born September 12, 1989) is a professional Canadian football defensive lineman for the Hamilton Tiger-Cats of the Canadian Football League (CFL). After the 2012 CIS season, he was ranked as the seventh best player in the CFL's Amateur Scouting Bureau final rankings for players eligible in the 2013 CFL Draft and fourth by players in Canadian Interuniversity Sport. D'Aguilar was drafted in the second round, 13th overall by the Calgary Stampeders and signed with the team on May 21, 2013. He played for the Stampeders for five years, winning one Grey Cup, before being released and signed by the Tiger-Cats. He played college football for the McMaster Marauders and helped them to win the 47th Vanier Cup

References

External links
Hamilton Tiger-Cats bio
Calgary Stampeders bio

1989 births
Living people
Players of Canadian football from Ontario
Canadian football defensive linemen
McMaster Marauders football players
Calgary Stampeders players
Hamilton Tiger-Cats players
Sportspeople from Hamilton, Ontario